Topaz Solar Farm is a 550 megawatt (MWAC)  photovoltaic power station in San Luis Obispo County, California, United States. Construction on the project began in November 2011 and ended in November 2014. It is one of the world's largest solar farms. The $2.5 billion project includes 9 million CdTe photovoltaic modules based on thin-film technology, manufactured by U.S. company First Solar. The company also built, operates and maintains the project for MidAmerican Renewables, a Berkshire Hathaway company. Pacific Gas and Electric will buy the electricity under a 25-year power purchase agreement. According to First Solar, it created about 400 construction jobs.

History 

OptiSolar, the instigator of the project, had optioned  of ranchland,
In November 2009, First Solar announced that it had purchased options to an additional  from Ausra's canceled Carrizo Energy Solar Farm. First Solar would reconfigure the project to minimize the use of land covered by the Williamson Act.

The project uses nine million thin-film cadmium telluride PV panels designed and manufactured by First Solar. The plant's power would be generated during the middle of the day, when demand for electricity — and price — is much higher than at night. The project was expected to begin construction in 2011 and be fully operational by 2014. California utilities are mandated to get 33% of their energy from renewable sources by 2020.

On August 14, 2008, Pacific Gas and Electric Company announced agreements to buy the power from Topaz Solar Farm and High Plains Ranch.
In late October 2010 the San Luis Obispo Department Planning and Building released a Draft Environmental Impact report.

In June 2011, the U.S. Department of Energy offered First Solar a $1.9 billion loan guarantee to cover part of the financing for the project. The First Solar project was not able to close its conditional loan guarantee with the Department of Energy prior to the September 30 deadline, but it has gone ahead anyway.

On May 18, 2012, First Solar announced the installation of the first PV panel. On October 24, 2012, First Solar announced the installation of the millionth panel. The plant began providing energy to the grid in February 2013.
The five-millionth panel was installed in October 2013.

On January 10, 2019, with Pacific Gas and Electric Company facing billions of dollars in wildfire liabilities, S&P Global Ratings cut the credit rating of Berkshire Hathaway Energy's 550-megawatt Topaz Solar Farms to junk, noting that the plant counts on PG&E for all of its revenue.

Electricity production

Gallery

See also 

 California Valley Solar Ranch
 Carrizo Energy Solar Farm
 Desert Sunlight Solar Farm
 Solar power in California

References

External links 

Solar power stations in California
Buildings and structures in San Luis Obispo County, California
Photovoltaic power stations in the United States
Energy infrastructure completed in 2014
2014 establishments in California